SCA Health (SCA), is one of the largest providers of outpatient surgery in the United States. Based in Deerfield, Illinois, the company has a network of 300+ ambulatory surgery centers (ASCs) in 35 states performing 1 million procedures a year. Since March 2017, the company is part of Optum.

SCA creates partnerships between health plans, physician groups, and health systems, to acquire, develop and optimize surgical facilities. SCA's affiliated physicians provide a range of surgical services, including orthopedics, ophthalmology, gastroenterology, pain management, otolaryngology (ear, nose and throat, or ENT), urology, spine, cardiology, and gynecology, as well as other general surgery procedures.

In 2015, SCA was named one of Becker’s ASC Review’s “Best Places to Work in Healthcare”.

History
Surgical Care Affiliates was founded in 1982 by Joel Gordon in Nashville, Tennessee. Gordon had previously founded General Care Corp (NYSE: GCE) in 1969, a hospital company that was sold to Hospital Corporation of America (“HCA”) in 1980. Subsequent to selling General Care Corp to HCA, Gordon partnered with Andrew “Woody” Miller, an HCA executive, and Jack Massey, a co-founder of HCA and American venture capitalist, to launch SCA. SCA raised capital by listing shares on the New York Stock Exchange and used the proceeds to acquire existing surgery centers and build new surgery centers, mostly in the southeast. From 1982 to 1995, SCA grew to approximately 67 facilities, with Ken Melkus serving as the CEO for most of that time.

HealthSouth Corporation acquired SCA in October 1995 and closed the Nashville office which had been consolidated into the company's surgery division office located at the HealthSouth Corporate Campus in Birmingham, Alabama. The acquisition, along with several previous surgery center company acquisitions, made HealthSouth the largest provider of outpatient surgery in the nation with a total of 126 surgery centers. HealthSouth acquired other surgery center companies, including ASC Network Corp and National Surgery Centers, and independent facilities during this period. In March 2007, HealthSouth announced that it would sell its surgery center division to TPG Capital (TPG), a large private equity firm.

In June 2007, TPG Capital acquired the assets of HealthSouth’s surgery division, effectively forming SCA as a new, stand-alone company. The company was named Surgical Care Affiliates, in recognition of the original SCA, and headquartered in Birmingham where the company continues to maintain its administrative headquarters and largest base of employees. In May 2008, Andrew Hayek was hired as president and chief executive officer. Hayek had previously been president of a division of DaVita Healthcare Partners (now Optum) and had been president and chief operating officer of Alliance Healthcare Services.

In October 2013, the company issued an IPO.

In January 2021, the company was indicted by a federal grand jury on charges of labor market collusion. According to the Department of Justice, "Beginning at least as early as May 2010 and continuing until at least as late as October 2017, SCA conspired with a company based in Texas to allocate senior-level employees by agreeing not to solicit each other’s senior-level employees. Beginning at least as early as February 2012 and continuing until at least as late as July 2017, SCA separately conspired with a company based in Colorado to allocate senior-level employees through a similar non-solicitation agreement." In July 2021, the Colorado company was identified by the Department of Justice as DaVita Inc.

In May 2022, the company rebranded from Surgical Care Affiliates to SCA Health.

Partnerships

Texas Health Resources
In October 2012, SCA partnered with Texas Health Resources leadership to design and execute  a surgical strategy in the Dallas / Fort Worth market. Together with community surgeons, the partnership has grown from two facilities to 15 facilities.

Monarch Healthcare
SCA is partnered with Monarch HealthCare, Orange County’s largest association of physicians in private practice. In 2011, Monarch HealthCare was acquired by Optum, UnitedHealth’s health services division. In February 2013, SCA entered into a joint venture partnership with Memorial Care Medical Foundation and Monarch HealthCare to optimize surgery in Southern California; the partnership now has 9 ASCs.

Advocate Health Care
In 2015, Advocate Health Care and SCA entered a joint venture to acquire and develop a surgery center network. Advocate Health Care was the largest fully integrated healthcare delivery system in the state of Illinois; the partnership currently has a total portfolio of 15 surgery centers, with more in development.

SwiftPath
In May 2016, SCA made an investment in SwiftPath, LLC, which develops evidence-based, rapid recovery protocols that enable surgeons to perform hip and knee replacements in an outpatient setting. The SwiftPath platform includes patient engagement and education, patient selection criteria, and peer-reviewed surgical techniques. SCA currently has 43 outpatient facilities performing total joint replacements.

One World Surgery
SCA is the foundational corporate partner to the nonprofit One World Surgery. One World Surgery funds and operates an ambulatory surgery center located near Tegucigalpa, Honduras, on the grounds of a 2,000 acre orphanage (part of the Nuestros Pequeños Hermanos network) with more than 500 children. During week-long surgical medical mission trips to Honduras, US-based physicians, nurses, clinical and non-clinical personnel provide free surgical care to people who cannot afford care, or have limited access to care. The program partnered with the Holy Family Surgery Center.

References

External links

2013 initial public offerings
2017 mergers and acquisitions
American companies established in 2007
Health care companies based in Illinois
Companies based in Deerfield, Illinois
Companies formerly listed on the Nasdaq